Algonquin is a 2013 Canadian drama film written and directed by Jonathan Hayes. It stars Mark Rendall, Nicholas Campbell, Sheila McCarthy, Michael Levinson, and Victoria Sanchez.

Plot
Leif (Nicholas Campbell), a travel writer whose career has declined, visits his son Jake (Mark Rendall). The father plans to produce a book about Algonquin Park and invites his son to join him in its writing. Leif also meets up with Rita (Sheila McCarthy), his former wife and Jake's mother. Matters are complicated when they are joined by Carmen (Victoria Sanchez), Leif's young romantic partner, and her son Iggy (Michael Levinson). Leif and Jake then proceed with a canoe trip through Algonquin Park to find a particular horseshoe.

Cast

Production
Algonquin marks the first time that Hayes has written and directed a feature film.

Release
The film was first screened at the Montreal World Film Festival on 24 August 2013.

References

External links
 
 Algonquin at Berkeley Films

2013 films
Canadian drama films
Films set in Northern Ontario
Canoeing films
English-language Canadian films
2013 drama films
2010s English-language films
2010s Canadian films